Sébastien Grosjean defeated Yevgeny Kafelnikov in the final, 7–6(7–3), 6–1, 6–7(5–7), 6–4 to win the singles tennis title at the 2001 Paris Masters.

Marat Safin was the defending champion, but lost in the third round to Andreas Vinciguerra.

Seeds
A champion seed is indicated in bold text while text in italics indicates the round in which that seed was eliminated.  All sixteen seeds received a bye into the second round.

Draw

Finals

Top half

Section 1

Section 2

Bottom half

Section 3

Section 4

References
 2001 Paris Masters Draw

2001 Paris Masters
Singles